Andreas Skotidas was a Greek fencer. He competed in the individual and team épée and team sabre events at the 1948 Summer Olympics.

References

External links
  

Year of birth missing
Possibly living people
Greek male épée fencers
Olympic fencers of Greece
Fencers at the 1948 Summer Olympics
Greek male sabre fencers